Barbara Hamilton was a pioneering American woman drag racer. In 1963, she was the first woman licensed by the National Hot Rod Association (NHRA) to race a supercharged gasser.

Notes 

Year of birth missing (living people)
Living people
Dragster drivers
Female dragster drivers
American female racing drivers
American racing drivers
21st-century American women